Illumina is the third album by Alisha's Attic, and the second to be released internationally. It was released on October 5, 1998, and peaked at #15 on the UK album chart. Three of its tracks were released as singles: "The Incidentals" (which reached #13 in the UK charts), "Wish I Were You" and "Barbarella".

Track listing
All tracks composed and arranged by Alisha's Attic (Karen Poole, Shelly Poole and Terry Martin)
"The Incidentals" – 3:10
"Going Down" – 4:32
"Shameless" – 1:27
"Resistor" – 3:34
"Air and Angels" – 3:36
"Wish I Were You" – 3:49
"Me and the Dolphins" – 1:30
"Barbarella" – 3:58
"Are You Jealous?" – 3:56
"Lazy Head" – 3:47
"Do I Lie?" – 3:28
"Karmically Close" – 3:34
"Dive In" – 3:57
"Lay Low" – 2:51
"Outta These Clouds" – 2:39

Personnel
Alisha's Attic
Karen Poole - vocals
Shelly Poole - vocals
with:
Ann Klein, David A. Stewart, Marcus Myers, Mike Lustig, Reeves Gabrels - guitar
Mark Plati - guitar, bass, keyboards, programming, percussion, string arrangements on "The Incidentals" and "Lay Low"
Dave Catlin-Birch - bass on "Barbarella"
Fil Eisler - bass on "Do I Lie?"
Reece Gilmore - keyboards, programming
Kenny Dickenson - additional keyboards on "Barbarella"
Chris Sharrock - drums, percussion
Mike Levesque, Shawn Pelton - drums
Everett Bradley - percussion
Amanda Riesman - string arrangement on "Dive In"
Technical
Mark Plati - engineer, mixing
Nick Addison - engineer, mixing
Ash Howes - mixing
Tom Bird - art direction
Andy Earl - photography

References

External links

Alisha's Attic albums
1998 albums
Albums produced by Mark Plati
Albums produced by David A. Stewart
Mercury Records albums